OK Computer OKNOTOK 1997 2017 is a reissue of the 1997 album OK Computer by the English rock band Radiohead. It was released in June 2017, the album's 20th anniversary, following the 2016 acquisition of Radiohead's back catalogue by XL Recordings from EMI.

OKNOTOK comprises remastered versions of OK Computer and its B-sides, plus three previously unreleased songs: "I Promise", "Man of War", and "Lift". The special edition includes an art book, notes, and a cassette tape of demos and session recordings. Unlike previous Radiohead reissues, which were released by EMI without Radiohead's involvement and contained no new material, the band curated the OKNOTOK material themselves.

Radiohead promoted OKNOTOK with a teaser campaign of posters and videos. Music videos were released for the three new songs, and "I Promise" and "Man of War" were released as singles. OKNOTOK debuted at number two in the UK Albums Chart and was the bestselling album in UK independent record stores for a year. It reached number 23 on the US Billboard 200 and received critical acclaim.

Background 

Radiohead released OK Computer, their third album, in May 1997, through EMI. It was recorded in 1996 and 1997 at St Catherine's Court, a historic mansion near Bath. The album won Best Alternative Album at the 40th Grammy Awards and has sold at least 4.5 million copies worldwide. According to Acclaimed Music, which tracks music reviews, OK Computer is the eighth-most acclaimed album of all time.

Radiohead's record contract with EMI ended with the release of Hail to the Thief in 2003. Their subsequent albums have been released by XL Recordings, while EMI retained the copyright to Radiohead's back catalogue. After a period of being out of print on vinyl, EMI reissued a double LP of OK Computer without Radiohead's involvement in 2008, and again in 2009 as an expanded "Collector's Edition". The reissues were not remastered and contained no new material.

In 2016, with Radiohead's approval, their back catalogue was transferred to XL Recordings and the "Collector's Editions" were removed from streaming services. In May 2016, XL reissued Radiohead's back catalogue on vinyl, including OK Computer.

Content 
OKNOTOK 1997 2017 comprises remastered versions of OK Computer and its eight B-sides, plus three previously unreleased tracks: "I Promise", featuring strummed acoustic guitar, marching band-like drums, and Mellotron; "Man of War", a ballad with strings, piano, and electric guitar; and "Lift", a Britpop-like ballad.

The special edition includes the album on vinyl, a hardcover artbook, a book of songwriter Thom Yorke's notes, and a sketchbook of preparatory artwork by Yorke and cover artist Stanley Donwood. It also includes an audio cassette containing audio experiments, session recordings, demos (including demos for two previously unheard songs), and early versions of "The National Anthem", "Motion Picture Soundtrack", "Nude" and "True Love Waits", songs released on later albums.

The final track on the cassette, "OK Computer Program", comprises computer tones which, when run on a ZX Spectrum computer, load a short computer program. The program lists the band members and the date 19 December 1996, then plays several minutes of electronic tones and displays the text: "Congratulations....you've found the secret message syd lives hmmmm. We should get out more". OKNOTOK is dedicated to Rachel Owen, Yorke's ex-wife, who died from cancer months prior to the album release.

Promotion and release 
Before its announcement on 2 May 2017, Radiohead promoted OKNOTOK with posters in cities around the world featuring "cryptic" messages, and a teaser video featuring "glitchy" computer graphics and lyrics from "Climbing Up the Walls". The download and CD editions of OKNOTOK were released on 23 June 2017, and the boxed edition shipped in July. Radiohead released "I Promise" on 2 June and "Man of War" on 22 June as downloads for those who had pre-ordered OKNOTOK, accompanied by music videos. A video for "Lift" followed on 12 September.

On 11 July, Radiohead released an "unboxing" video previewing the contents of the special edition. The video features Chieftain Mews, a character created by the band who appears in webcasts and promotional material. In December 2019, Radiohead uploaded all their albums, including OKNOTOK, to YouTube. In January 2020, they added the OKNOTOK special edition cassette to their website as part of the Radiohead Public Library, an online archive of their work.

Sales 
OKNOTOK debuted at number two in the UK Albums Chart, boosted by Radiohead's third headline performance at Glastonbury Festival. It was the bestselling album in UK independent record shops between April 2017 and April 2018. In the US, it sold 13,000 copies in its first week, reaching number 36 on the Billboard 200. Following the vinyl and boxed edition release two weeks later, it re-entered the chart at number 23, selling another 17,000 copies (including 8,000 on vinyl and 7,000 on CD). On 19 October 2018, OKNOTOK was certified gold by the BPI for sales of over 100,000.

Reception 
On the review aggregator website Metacritic, OKNOTOK has a score of 100 out of 100 based on 15 reviews, indicating "universal acclaim". Praise focused on the previously unreleased material. The Observer wrote that the reissue, with its "excellent" unreleased songs, proved that Radiohead were "the world's greatest rock band, pushing the limits of what they, or anyone else, could achieve". PopMatters selected "Man of War" as the best of the new tracks. Pitchfork wrote that the best feature was "hearing how the lost material informs the original album". The Record Collector critic Jamie Atkins praised the cassette in the special edition, particularly its version of "Motion Picture Soundtrack", writing: "To these ears it’s one of the performances of [Yorke's] career. He begins sounding utterly wounded until – as if revelling in the places his voice is capable of taking the song – it ends up becoming something quite defiant."

Track listing

Personnel 

 Nigel Godrich – committing to tape, production
 Radiohead – committing to tape, music, strings arrangement
 Thom Yorke
 Jonny Greenwood
 Philip Selway
 Ed O'Brien
 Colin Greenwood
 Nick Ingman – strings conducting
 Gerard Navarro – original studio assistance
 Jon Bailey – original studio assistance
 Chris Scard – original studio assistance
 Royal Philharmonic Orchestra – strings on "Man of War"
 Robert Ziegler – conducting
 Sam Petts Davis – engineering
 Fiona Cruickshank – engineering
 Bob Ludwig – remastering
 Stanley Donwood – pictures
 The White Chocolate Farm – pictures

Charts

Weekly charts

Year-end charts

Notes

References 

Bibliography

2017 compilation albums
Radiohead compilation albums
Albums produced by Nigel Godrich
XL Recordings compilation albums